Albi Dosti (born 13 September 1991) is an Albanian professional footballer who plays as a midfielder for SV Bevern. He has also been a member of Albania national team, making one appearance in 2014.

Club career

Early career
Dosti began his career with Teuta Durrës, making his debut at the age of 17. He has played over 6 league games for the club since making his debut in the 2007–08 season.

Kukësi
On 23 August 2013, Dosti joined fellow top flight side Kukësi by penning a 1+1 contract.

Montana
On 16 July 2015, Dosti signed a two-year deal with the Bulgarian side Montana, a club which plays in the elite of Bulgarian football. On 3 August, he made his A Group debut from the bench, coming into the game for Ivan Minchev in the 77th minute during the 2–1 loss against Litex Lovech at Lovech Stadium.

Laçi
On 27 January 2016, Dosti returned in Albania by signing a six-month contract with Laçi of Albanian Superliga, rejoining his first manager Stavri Nica.

Šibenik
On 12 July 2016, Dosti completed a transfer to Croatian Second Football League side Šibenik, penning a one-year contract. During an interview, he said that he turned down several offers from Albanian clubs just to play in Croatia, where, according to him, is shown proper attention to players.

Teuta Durrës
On 4 July 2017, Dosti returned to his first senior club Teuta Durrës by signing a contract for the 2017–18 season with an option to renew, taking the squad number 10. This marked his return in Durrës after four years, and Dosti commented this by stating: "I'm very happy to be part of Teuta for the upcoming season. I promise that I'll extenuate that trust of Teuta directors on me." Dosti started the season on 9 September by playing full-90 minutes in the opening match of 2017–18 Albanian Superliga against Luftëtari Gjirokastër which was won 2–1 at home. His first score-sheet contributions came later on matchday 5, scoring his team's only goal in a 1–2 home loss to Partizani Tirana. On 30 October, following the 2–1 defeat at Lushnja which was the fourth consecutive and fifth in six matches, Dosti was released by the club due to bad performances and being tagged as one of culprits for the team crisis.

Kukësi return
In November 2017, following his release from Teuta, Dosti returned to Kukësi but only to train and is set to sign in January transfer window.

SV Bevern
In December 2017, Dosti signed for German club SV Bevern.

International career
On 8 June 2014, Dosti made his debut with Albania against San Marino at San Marino Stadium in Serravalle, replacing Armando Vajushi for the last 20 minutes of 3–0 away win.

Career statistics

Club

International

References

External links
 
 
 

1991 births
Living people
People from Krujë
Albanian footballers
Association football forwards
Association football midfielders
Albania international footballers
Kategoria Superiore players
First Professional Football League (Bulgaria) players
First Football League (Croatia) players
Kategoria e Parë players
KF Teuta Durrës players
FK Kukësi players
FC Montana players
KF Laçi players
HNK Šibenik players
KF Bylis Ballsh players
SV Bevern players
Albanian expatriate footballers
Expatriate footballers in Bulgaria
Expatriate footballers in Croatia
Expatriate footballers in Germany
Albanian expatriate sportspeople in Bulgaria
Albanian expatriate sportspeople in Croatia
Albanian expatriate sportspeople in Germany